Lisa Cano Burkhead (born 1970/1971) is an American educator and politician who served as the 36th lieutenant governor of Nevada from 2021 to 2023. She was nominated by Governor Steve Sisolak to replace Kate Marshall in December 2021. Prior to serving as lieutenant governor, Cano Burkhead was a teacher and principal in Clark County, Nevada schools. She ran for a full term but was defeated by Stavros Anthony, a member of the Las Vegas city council.

Early life and education
Cano Burkhead was born in Las Vegas, Nevada. Her father was from Argentina and her mother was from Paraguay. She received her teaching degree and a dual degree in Spanish and English from the University of Redlands.

Career
Cano Burkhead worked as an educator since 1996, when she began as a Spanish and English teacher in Clark County. She was the dean of students and assistant principal at Eldorado High School. She was chief of staff to Richard A. Carranza, Nevada's northwest region superintendent before becoming principal of Fertitta Middle School from 2010 until 2015. Cano Burkhead then was principal of Foothill High School from 2015 until her retirement in July 2021.

In 2008, she was honored with the Nevada Association of Student Councils' Administrator of the Year Award.

Early political career
Cano Burkhead ran unsuccessfully for the Nevada Assembly in the 2002 election cycle. She also served as a member of the Paradise, Nevada Town Board.

Lieutenant governor of Nevada
On December 16, 2021, Governor Steve Sisolak named Cano Burkhead as the state's lieutenant governor, following the resignation of Kate Marshall in September. Cano Burkhead was sworn into the position shortly after the Sisolak's announcement, and she also announced her intentions to run for a full term in the 2022 lieutenant gubernatorial election. She delivered her ceremonial remarks in English and Spanish.

Cano Burkhead has said two of her main focuses as lieutenant governor are salaries for state educators and providing sufficient supplies for schools.

Electoral History

Personal life
Cano Burkhead was briefly married to Mario Sanchez, a Las Vegas business owner. She is now married to Jeffrey Burkhead and they have three daughters. They live in Henderson, Nevada.

See also 
 List of minority governors and lieutenant governors in the United States

References

External links
 Official biography at The Office of the Governor of Nevada

|-

1970s births
21st-century American politicians
21st-century American women politicians
American high school teachers
American people of Argentine descent
American people of Paraguayan descent
Educators from Nevada
Hispanic and Latino American women in politics
Lieutenant Governors of Nevada
Living people
Nevada Democrats
People from Henderson, Nevada
Politicians from Las Vegas
University of Redlands alumni
Women in Nevada politics